I've Got That Old Feeling is an album by American bluegrass-country singer and musician Alison Krauss, released in 1990. It reached number 61 on the Billboard Country Albums chart.

At the 33rd Grammy Awards, the album's title track, "I've Got That Old Feeling", won Best Bluegrass Recording for 1990. The album was produced by Bil VornDick and Jerry Douglas, who was also featured on dobro.

Track listing
 "I've Got That Old Feeling" (Sidney Cox) – 2:53
 "Dark Skies" (John Pennell) – 2:20
 "Wish I Still Had You" (Sidney Cox) – 3:44
 "Endless Highway" (Roger Rasnake) – 2:20
 "Winter Of A Broken Heart" (Nelson Mandrell) – 2:56
 "It's Over" (Nelson Mandrell) – 3:06
 "Will You Be Leaving" (John Pennell) – 2:22
 "Steel Rails" (Louisa Branscomb) – 2:17
 "Tonight I'll Be Lonely Too" (Sidney Cox) – 3:25
 "One Good Reason" (John Pennell) – 3:06
 "That Makes One Of Us" (Rick Bowles, Barbara Wyrick) – 3:20
 "Longest Highway" (Cox) – 2:48

Personnel
 Alison Krauss – fiddle, vocals
 Sam Bush – mandolin
 Jeff White – guitar, vocals
 Alison Brown – banjo, vocals
 Stuart Duncan – mandolin
 Edgar Meyer – bass
 Martin Parker – drums
 Dave Pomeroy – bass
 Pete Wasner – piano
 Suzanne Cox – vocals
 Glenn Worf – bass 
 Jerry Douglas – dobro

Chart performance

References

1990 albums
Alison Krauss & Union Station albums
Rounder Records albums
Grammy Award for Best Bluegrass Album